Dual-voltage could refer to:

 Multi-system (rail), in which the trains are able to operate on more than one railway electrification systems
 Dual-voltage CPU, in which a CPU can supply a different output voltage than the input
 42-volt electrical system, automotive wiring, where some implementations run combined 14 V/42 V electrics
 Mains electricity, for North American household 120V/240V grid power systems